Santaan is a 1993 Indian Hindi-language drama film, produced by D. Ramanaidu of Suresh Productions and directed by Dasari Narayana Rao. It stars Jeetendra, Moushumi Chatterjee, Deepak Tijori, Neelam, with music composed by Anand–Milind. The film is remake of the Telugu film Surigaadu (1992), made by the same banner and director.

Plot
Sarju Narayan a watchman lives along with his wife Lakshmi. The couple loves endears their son Amar and Sarju strives to civilize him. However, Amar cons and concocts as a toff and falsifies his parents too. He falls for benevolent Aasha, daughter of business magnate Sethji. After a while, Aasha learns the actuality and berates his perfidy but he muddles through. Besides, Sarju works out to acquire a fine job for Amar using his influence when he rejects to affirm him as his father. Thus, Sarju discovers his imposture and necks him out. Accordingly, Amar & Aasha marries, and Sarju & Lakshmi visit the wedding at the request of Aasha where they are disregarded. Now Aasha declares to Amar that their marital life will begin only after he respects his parents. Then, Sethji rues in grabbing the land allotted to Sarju for his gain. Hence, he makes Amar welcome his parents by forging as a reformed person which they accept. Time passes, Aasha gives birth to a baby boy and gradually Sarju & Lakshmi are transformed into servants. After being subjected to several humiliations, they quit the house when Lakshmi collapses knowing the betrayal of Amar. Here, Sarju realizes that Lakshmi is suffering from heart problems and must get operated on soon. Immediately, he approaches Amar for help but he denies it. Since all avenues closed, Sarju sues Amar to pay back the amount which he has spent on him. Amar's behavior never proclaims their parentage. At last, the court gives judgment in favor of Sarju. Finally, the movie ends with Sarju & Lakshmi moving abroad for treatment.

Cast

Jeetendra as Sarju Narayan Singh
Moushumi Chatterjee as Laxmi Singh
Deepak Tijori as Amar Singh
Neelam as Asha
Navin Nischol as Mr. Saxena
Prem Chopra as Seth
Suresh Oberoi as Judge 
Johnny Lever as Kaalia
Kunika as Gulaabi
Laxmikant Berde as Vachani 
Asrani as Champak
Satyendra Kapoor as Seetaram
Guddi Maruti as Vachani Daughter
Deven Bhojani as Bunty College friend of Amar.
Javed Khan Amrohi as Postman
Adi Irani as Ajay 
Rakesh Pandey as Mannsukhani,Defence lawyer

Soundtrack

External links

1990s Hindi-language films
1993 films
Indian drama films
Films directed by Dasari Narayana Rao
Films scored by Anand–Milind
Hindi remakes of Telugu films
Hindi-language drama films
Suresh Productions films